Maximilian Mittelstädt (born 18 March 1997) is a German footballer who plays as a left-back for Bundesliga club Hertha BSC.

Career
He made his professional debut on 2 March 2016 in a Bundesliga match against Eintracht Frankfurt.

International career
Mittelstädt is a youth international footballer for Germany.

Career statistics

Honours
Hertha BSC U19
 DFB-Pokal Junior: 2014–15

Individual
 Fritz Walter Medal U19 Bronze: 2016

References

External links

Profile at the Hertha BSC website

1997 births
Living people
German footballers
Germany youth international footballers
Hertha BSC II players
Hertha BSC players
Bundesliga players
Association football defenders
Footballers from Berlin
Germany under-21 international footballers
SC Staaken players